Eustephieae is a tribe (in the family Amaryllidaceae, subfamily Amaryllidoideae), where it forms part of the Andean clade, one of two American clades.

Taxonomy

Phylogeny 
This tribe was resurrected from the Stenomesseae in 1995 by Meerow. The placement of Eustephieae within subfamily Amaryllidoideae is shown in the following cladogram, where this tribe is shown as a sister group to the remainder of the tetraploid Andean clade.

Subdivision 
Four genera:
 Eustephia
 Chlidanthus
 Hieronymiella
 Pyrolirion

Distribution 
The Eustephieae for the southern limit of the Andean clade. They are found in Peru in the southern Andes, and 
the northern Andes of Argentina, Bolivia and Chile. This is distinct from the central Andean distribution of the remainder of the parent clade.

References

Bibliography

 , in 
 
(additional excerpts)

External links 

Amaryllidoideae
Asparagales tribes